The mountain noctule (Nyctalus montanus) is a species of bat found in Afghanistan, India, Pakistan, and Nepal.

References

Mammals of Nepal
Mammals of Pakistan
Mammals of Afghanistan
Nyctalus
Mammals described in 1906
Bats of Asia
Taxa named by Gerald Edwin Hamilton Barrett-Hamilton